Las tres perfectas casadas ("The Three Perfect Wives") is a 1953 Mexican comedy film directed by Roberto Gavaldón, based on the eponymous play by Alejandro Casona. It was entered into the 1953 Cannes Film Festival.

Synopsis 
The tranquility of three married couples is interrupted when after the death of Gustavo Ferrán (Arturo de Córdova), a mutual friend leaves a letter saying that he was the lover of the three women. When he reappears, nothing will ever be the same again.

Cast
 Arturo de Córdova
 Laura Hidalgo
 Miroslava as Leopoldina
 José María Linares-Rivas
 René Cardona
 José Elías Moreno
 Consuelo Frank
 Alma Delia Fuentes
 Arturo Soto Rangel
 Armando Sáenz
 Francisco Jambrina

References

External links

1953 films
1950s Spanish-language films
1953 comedy films
Mexican black-and-white films
Films directed by Roberto Gavaldón
Mexican comedy films
1950s Mexican films